Elli Robert Fitoussi (born 1 January 1947), better known as F. R. David, is a French musician. He is best known for his 1982 hit single "Words".

Career

F. R. David was born Elli Robert Fitoussi in Menzel Bourguiba, then in the French protectorate of Tunisia, to a Tunisian Jewish family. In Paris, David began his music career as Robert Fitoussi. He first performed with French garage band Les Trèfles. After one EP, they mutated into Les Boots, but achieved very little commercial success. Adopting his new stage name, he went solo in 1967 and recorded some orchestral pop psych with Michel Colombier, including a version of the Beatles' "Strawberry Fields Forever" ("Il Est Plus Facile"). He enjoyed minor hits with the Éric Charden penned "Symphonie" and a cover of the Bee Gees' "Sir Geoffrey Saved the World", but this success did not last. He then created Aztec Records with Sonopress & Carrer and started producing with Michael Haubrich and they wrote and produced several groups. The first was called Cockpit, followed by David Cast, Doc & Prohibition Group, Ragga, Alain Maria, Freddy Meyer, and DD Daughterdydawn with Vangelis Papathanassiou.

During the early 1970s, David formed the progressive rock group David Explosion but their one album was not a success. He was a guitarist for Vangelis in the early 1970s. With Vangelis, he also appeared as vocalist on some of his early 1970s albums. David's voice is also heard on the 1974 single "Who" by Vangelis under the name 'Odyssey'. David then joined French rock band Les Variations, appearing on their final album Café De Paris (1975), which featured an early rock-disco crossover "Superman, Superman". When the band broke up, he went solo again. His personal "trademarks" are his sunglasses and his guitar (a white Fender Stratocaster).

His most recognised song was his hit "Words" in 1982, which sold eight million records worldwide, topped various charts around Europe in late 1982, and reached No. 2 on the UK Singles Chart in spring 1983, surpassing a rival version by 1960s hitmakers the Tremeloes, and going on to becoming the 22nd best-selling single in the UK during 1983. The song appears in the Oscar-nominated film for Best Picture, Call Me by Your Name. The song is a catchy, slightly plaintive synth-led mid-tempo ballad sung in a slender, high-pitched voice.

During the 1990s, he took time out from his own music career and focused on writing and composing for other well known artists. David released another album, Words – '99 Version in 2000 which contains mostly covers. In 2009, he released the album Numbers, which was in collaboration with other musicians and featured songs that David himself most preferred.

Between 2010 and 2011, he went on a national French tour of 52 concerts.

Discography

Studio albums

Compilation albums
 Rocker Blues (1986, Argentina only)
 Greatest Hits (1991)
 Best of F. R. David (2000)
 Songbook (2003)

Singles

Discography in other formations
with Les Trèfles
 Sont ils innocent? (EP, 1965)
with Les Boots
 "Laissez briller le soleil"/"Trop tard"/"Le cerf-volant"/"Demain" (EP, 1966)
 "Les gens sont méchants"/"Ali Baba"/"Vingt ans"/"Twen" (EP, 1966)
 Tout Va Bien (Compilation, 1997)
with Cockpit
 Cockpit (album, 1971)
 "Fifi"/"Father Machine" (single, 1971)
 "Bright Tomorrow"/"Lena, Lena" (single, 1971)
 "Mister Hardy"/"8 Days and a Wake Up" (single, 1972)
with Les Variations
 Café de Paris (album, 1975)
with King of Hearts
 Close, but No Guitar (album, 1978)

References

External links
 F. R. DAVID's Official Website

1947 births
English-language singers from France
French male singer-songwriters
20th-century Tunisian male singers
Les Variations members
Living people
People from Bizerte Governorate
Tunisian Jews
Tunisian emigrants to France
Carrere Records artists
Columbia Records artists
Epic Records artists
Sony Music artists
Singers from Paris
20th-century French male singers
21st-century French male singers